To Live to Love is a 2006 Chinese period TV drama series directed by Ding Hei, based on Wang Anyi's 1995 novel The Song of Everlasting Sorrow. The series stars Huang Yi and Maggie Cheung Ho-yee as the protagonist Wang Qiyao in different ages. It also stars Tse Kwan-ho (as Mr. Cheng), Wu Hsing-kuo (as Director Li), Xu Zheng (as Kang Mingxun), and Chen Lina (as Jiang Lili).

Filming
Filming began in July 2004 in Soochow University, and moved to Shanghai, where the story is set, in August 2004. The series was first broadcast on March 28, 2006 on Shanghai Television.

Cast and characters
Episodes 1-14 deal with the years 1947–1950. These episodes correspond to roughly Part I and Part II, Chapter 1 of the novel. Episodes 14–35 deal with the years from 1958 to 1979.

References

2006 Chinese television series debuts
2006 Chinese television series endings
Television shows set in Shanghai
Television shows based on Chinese novels
Mandarin-language television shows
Television shows filmed in Shanghai
Television shows filmed in Jiangsu
Chinese romance television series
Chinese period television series
Television series set in the 1940s
Television series set in the 1950s
Television series set in the 1960s
Television series set in the 1970s
Television shows set in Nanjing